Hala Pionir Beograd is a concert album by the  Bosnian folk singer Halid Bešlić. It was released in 1988. A remastered version, named Iz sve snage (With All the Strength), was released in 1998 by Naraton.

Track listing
 (I Don't Want, I Don't Want Diamonds)
 (I Am Returning to my Mother in Bosnia)
 (I Remember)
 (Golden String)
 (The Apples Were Sweet)
 (That Woman is Greedy)
 (Give Me Poison)
 (In the Flame of One Fire)
 (A Guitar and a Glass of Wine)
 (How Could You Kiss Him?)
 (Enthralled by Your Beauty)
 (If Only You Would)

1988 live albums
Halid Bešlić albums